Warri Wolves FC (formerly called NPA FC) is a Nigerian football club formerly run by the Nigeria Port Authority. Prior to 2003 the club was based in Warri, Delta State, but moved to Lagos after promotion to the Nigerian Premier League in 2003.

History
After making the 2001 Super Four play-offs, NPA was relegated by three points the next season after winning only 10 of 34 league games. They were promoted again in 2003 after finishing second in Division 2. NPA FC ended their 2004/05 season near the bottom of the table and it was announced that 16 of their 40 players would be laid off. The team was relegated again after the 2005–06 season, and moved back to Warri in April 2007 after a deal with the government of Delta State. The team was renamed "Warri Wolves" at the start of the season and won promotion to the 2009 Premier League Season as champions of Division 1B. Wolves finished with 59 points from 18 wins, five draws and seven losses, scoring 42 goals and conceded 16. They were involved in an incident on March 8, 2008 when a pitch invasion after a goalless draw at First Bank FC left seven players and officials injured. They played the first part of the 2008–09 season in Oleh because of renovations to the Warri Stadium.
The Seasiders as they are fondly called are back in Warri City. They now play all their matches at the Warri Township Stadium.

Performance in CAF competitions
CAF Champions League: 1 appearance
2016 – First Round

CAF Confederation Cup: 3 appearances
2010 – First Round of 16
2012 – Second Round
2014 – Second Round

CAF Cup: 1 appearance
2002 – First Round (as NPA)

Staff
 Peter Nieketien (Technical Adviser)
 Moses Etu (Chairman)
 Azuka Chiemeka (Media Officer)
 Tony Okowa (Chairman of Delta Sports Commission)
 Ogenyi Evans (Head Coach)

Current squad
As of 3 January 2021

Coaching history
{|
|valign="top"|
 Maurice Cooreman (Jan 2005 - Jan 2006)
 Solomon Ogbeide (2008 - 2009)
 Paul Aigbogun (Jan 2010 - Feb 2012)
 Maurice Cooreman (Feb 2012 - Sept 2012)
 Edema Fuludu (2012 - 2012)
 Solomon Ogbeide (2013 - 2013)
 Paul Aigbogun (Jan 2014 - Jan 2016)
 Sam Okpodu (Jan 2016 - Jun 2016) 
 Ard Sluis (2016 - 2016)
 Mansur Abdullahi (July 2016 - 2016) 
 Ngozi Elechi (Aug 2019 - Sept 2019) 
 Evans Ogenyi (Sept 2019 - Current)

References

 
Football clubs in Nigeria
Delta State
Sports clubs in Nigeria